Suspected Person is a 1942 British drama film directed by Lawrence Huntington and starring Clifford Evans, Patricia Roc and David Farrar. The film was made at Welwyn Studios by Associated British, one of the two leading British studios of the era. It  was released in the United States in 1944 by Producers Releasing Corporation.

Synopsis
A British associate of some American gangsters double-crosses them following a bank robbery and escapes with the loot. He heads to London where his sister keeps a boarding house. She is unaware of his criminal career, but becomes suspicious when both Scotland Yard and his former associates both turn up on his trail.

Cast
 Clifford Evans as Jim Raynor  
 Patricia Roc as Joan Raynor  
 David Farrar as Inspector Thompson  
 Anne Firth as Carol  
 Robert Beatty as Franklin  
 Eric Clavering as Dolan 
 Leslie Perrins as Tony Garrett  
 Eliot Makeham as Davis
 John Salew as Jones  
 William Hartnell as Saunders  
 Martin Benson 
 Terry Conlin
 Anthony Shaw

References

Bibliography
 Slide, Anthony. Banned in the U.S.A.: British Films in the United States and Their Censorship, 1933-1966. I.B.Tauris, 1998.

External links

1942 films
British thriller films
British black-and-white films
1940s thriller films
Films directed by Lawrence Huntington
Films set in London
Films set in Liverpool
Films shot at Welwyn Studios
1940s English-language films
1940s British films